The Palace of Assembly is a legislative assembly building in Chandigarh, India. It was designed by modernist architect Le Corbusier. It is part of the Capitol Complex, which includes the Legislative Assembly, Secretariat and High Court. The Palace of Assembly features a circular assembly chamber, a forum for conversation and transactions, and stair-free circulation.

The building was designated as a UNESCO World Heritage Site in 2016.

History 

After the partition of Punjab in 1947 following the independence of India, the divided Punjab required a new capital to replace Lahore, which was now in Pakistan. Prime Minister Jawaharlal Nehru commissioned Le Corbusier to build a new city for the capital of Punjab.  This city would become Chandigarh.  Nehru desired that the city's design be "unfettered by the traditions of the past, a symbol of the nation's faith in the future". Subsequently, Corbusier and his team designed not just a large assembly and high court building, but all major buildings in the city, down to the door handles in public offices.  Construction of the Palace of Assembly began in 1951 and ended 11 years later in 1962. The building was inaugurated on 15 April 1964.

Today, many of the buildings in Chandigarh are considered modernist masterpieces, though most are in a state of neglect. In 2010, chairs from the assembly building were auctioned in London.  A diplomatic attempt to stop the sale failed, as the items were "condemned" and deemed unfit for use.

Design

Entrance 

Le Corbusier wanted to include an assembly door. He consulted with Prime Minister Nehru for symbols that could be depicted on the door to represent the new India and its modern vision. Nehru, in turn, entrusted Le Corbusier to invent them himself.

The door is adorned with vibrant colours and is divided into upper and lower halves. The upper half depicts man's relationship with the cosmos and includes imagery representing solstices, lunar eclipses and the Equinox. The lower half is populated with animals and natural forms. A desert depicts the original order of the Earth, while greenery represents the Garden Of Eden. The door also displays a river, trees, bulls and turtles, and the proverbial Tree of Knowledge in the centre of the door bears fruits of knowledge. The nearly 25 square foot door, with its enamelled panels, was airlifted from Paris.

This entrance is opened on certain ceremonial occasions.

Interior layout 
Le Corbusier believed that "architecture is circulation", and the Palace of Assembly is designed to encourage the movement of people and ideas.  High ceilings and narrow columns make the space feel expansive, and ramps replace stairs to provide fluid transitions between levels.  The General Assembly itself is circular - a literal interpretation of Le Corbusier's belief - and is off-centre within the space, challenging neoclassical architecture's focus on organization.

Gallery

References

Le Corbusier buildings in India
Government buildings completed in 1953
Tourist attractions in Chandigarh
Buildings and structures in Chandigarh
Legislative buildings in India